

Tehran City
In Tehran city the codes 11, 22, 33, 44, 55, 66, 77, 88, 99, 10, 20, 30, 40, 50, 60, 70, 80 and 90 are considered for the codes for license plates. Until now the codes 11, 22, 33, 44, 55, 66, 77, 88, and 99 are in use. other codes are reserved.
Tehran city is divided into 3 regions for issuing license plates
1. North: Municipality districts 1, 2 (Northern Parts), 3, 4, 5, 7, 8, 22
This area has the code 11.

2. Center: Municipality districts 2 (Southern Parts), 6, 10, 11, 12
This area has the code 22. 

3. South: Municipality districts 9, 13, 14, 15, 16, 17, 18, 19, 20, 21
This area has the code 33.

4. Reserved Codes: The codes 44, 55, 66, 77, 88 and 99 are designated to be used sequentially when any of the codes 11, 22 or 33 are used up. So far all the codes up to 88 are full and currently plates with code 99 are being issued.

Other counties of Tehran and Alborz Province
Other counties outside of Tehran municipal boundaries have the codes of 68, 78 and 21. 21 was designated as the reserved code but ithas been used up after various counties of the provinces used up all their available capacity in their designated letter for code 78. Thus code 38 was reassigned from Hamadan Province to where it's needed. In public cars, Taxis and Governal cars the letter is always the same. But in simple cars this letter (ب) depends on the city.

68
68 is Karaj county and Fardis County's code and all of the letters are for Karaj.

78

21

Road transport in Iran
Transport in Tehran